Japan Karate Association (日本 空手 協会; Nihon Karate Kyokai; JKA; sometimes referred to simply as Kyokai 協会 in Japan) is one of the oldest global Shotokan karate organization in the world.

Origins
Gichin Funakoshi played a major role in introducing karate from Okinawa to Japan, adjusted to reduce injury and merged with approaches for athletic training. On May 27, 1949, some of his senior students including Isao Obata, Masatoshi Nakayama, and Hidetaka Nishiyama, formed a karate organization dedicated to research, promotion, events management, and education: the Japan Karate Association. Funakoshi, then around 80 years old, held a position equivalent to chief instructor emeritus, with Nakayama as the chief instructor.

The JKA emerged from karate clubs at Japanese universities located in the Tokyo region. Most of these universities, however, distanced themselves from the JKA during the 1950s. Takushoku University always kept strong ties with the JKA, being the alma mater of many of the senior JKA instructors, such as Nakayama, Nishiyama, Okazaki, Asai, Kanazawa, and Enoeda, who were responsible for the JKA's consolidation during the 1960s and 1970s.

General uneasiness on how karate was taught by the JKA instructors and disagreements on Funakoshi's funeral arrangements in 1957 motivated some of the senior karateka connected with Funakoshi, but not associated with the JKA, such as Shigeru Egami, Genshin Hironishi, and Tsutomu Ohshima, to form their own organizations, such as Shotokai and Shotokan Karate of America). They claimed to practice a version of Shotokan karate closer to what Funakoshi taught, as compared to the JKA style. The JKA Shotokan approach is also based on Funakoshi's karate, but with significant adaptations introduced mostly by Nakayama, who was JKA chief instructor until his death in 1987. Under Nakayama's leadership, a generation of respected instructors spread karate worldwide, guided from the JKA headquarters in Tokyo.

Nakayama's books, which include Dynamic Karate and the Best Karate series, are fundamental reference materials on Shotokan karate as practiced under the JKA. Clive Nicol, in his classic book Moving Zen, describes the karate practice at the JKA's honbu dojo (headquarters training hall) in Tokyo during the early 1960s, from his unique perspective as a western karate student going from white to black belt in a few years.

Splinter groups
The JKA experienced several divisions from the 1970s onwards. Notable splinter groups formed as follows:

In 1974, one of the founders of JKA, Hidetaka Nishiyama, broke away from JKA and created the International Traditional Karate Federation (国際伝統空手連盟, Kokusai Dentō Karate Renmei) or ITKF.
In 1977, JKA instructor Shiro Asano formed his own organization, and invited master Hirokazu Kanazawa to take his place as chief instructor. The group is now known as Shotokan Karate-Do International Federation (SKIF).
Following Nakayama's death in 1987, the JKA experienced a turbulent period, both at the Tokyo headquarters and worldwide. Taiji Kase and Hiroshi Shirai (notable student of Hidetaka Nishiyama), both senior JKA instructors in Europe quit to form the World Union of Karate-Do Organizations. Taketo Okuda, JKA chief instructor in Brazil, quit to focus on his own organization, Butoku-kan.
In 1990, a legal dispute started between two groups about the control of JKA. One group was led by Tetsuhiko Asai, the other by Nobuyuki Nakahara. After several court rulings, the issue was ultimately settled by the Japanese Supreme Court on June 10, 1999, in favor of Nakahara's group, which included Masaaki Ueki and Masahiko Tanaka. The other group, led by Tetsuhiko Asai, JKA chief instructor after Nakayama, and including Keigo Abe and Mikio Yahara, left JKA to form other organizations: Japan Karate Shotorenmei, Japan Shotokan Karate Association, and Karatenomichi World Federation, respectively.
In 2007, the International Shotokan Karate Federation (ISKF), with headquarters in the US, led by Teruyuki Okazaki, 10th dan and one of the most senior JKA instructors, became independent. However, by 2010 at least two senior Instructors returned to the JKA.
In 2009, Takahashi Shunsuke broke away from JKA Australia to form the TSKF Australia (Traditional Shotokan Karate-Do Federation). TSKF joined Teruyuki Okazaki's ISKF in 2011.
By 2011, it was acknowledged that Masao Kawasoe, 7th Dan JKA, had returned to the JKA.

Due to these divisions, there is today the notion of a separate JKA karate style—that is, Shotokan karate that follows the JKA tradition to a large extent, but is taught by instructors who are not officially affiliated with JKA (though most of them are former JKA instructors and graduates).

Kenshusei (instructor intern) training program
In 1956, the JKA started its kenshusei instructor intern training program at the JKA honbu dojo, in Yotsuya, Tokyo, which had been built in 1955. This program was instituted by Nakayama Masatoshi. The training program has promoted the consistency and quality control of JKA training practices over the years, graduating some of the world's most well known karateka (practitioners of karate), as listed below.

Graduates
The following table lists JKA kenshusei training program graduates in order of year of graduation. The reported rank of graduates no longer with the JKA is that from their current organization. Such rank is not necessarily recognized by the JKA.

Note
This list is incomplete. For instance, it does not include some members who were expelled or resigned from the JKA see below:

 Kisaka Katsuharu (Katsuya) 8th dan JKA Instructor JKA of New Jersey, USA (current)
 Abe Keigo, 9th dan  (former JKA HQ instructor) JSKA Chief Instructor
 Aramoto Nobuyuki, 8th dan  (former JKA instructor)
 Asai Tetsuhiko, 10th dan (former HQ JKA instructor) JKS/IJKA Chief instructor (passed)
 Inaba Tsuneyuki, 7th dan  (former JKA instructor)
 Isaka Akito, 7th dan  (former JKA instructor) KWF
 Ishimine Minoru, 7th dan  (former JKA instructor)
 Kagawa Masao, 9th dan  (former JKA instructor) JKS Chief Instructor)
 Kanayama Kosho, 7th dan  (former JKA instructor) (Chief of Domestic Department JKS)
 Mizuno Yoshihisa, 8th dan  (former JKA instructor)
 Naito Takashi, 7th dan  (Has left E.T.K.F & returned to JKA)
 Tamang Pemba, 8th dan  (former JKA HQ instructor) NSKF Chief Instructor
 Yahara Mikio, 8th dan  (former JKA HQ instructor) KWF Chief Instructor
 Yamaguchi Takashi, 8th dan  (former JKA instructor) (Chief of International Department JKS)
 Kanazawa Hirokazu, 10th dan (former JKA HQ instructor) Chief instructor SKIF
 Kase Yasuharu, 10th dan (former JKA HQ instructor) Chief Instructor SRKH (passed)
 Kasuya Hitoshi, 9th dan  (former JKA instructor) Chief Instructor WSKF
 Katsumata (Suzuki) Yutaka, 7th dan  (former JKA instructor)
 Shirai Hiroshi, 10th dan  (former JKA instructor) WSKA
 Tatetsu Meicho, 7th dan  (former JKA instructor)
 Amos Richard, 8th dan (former JKA HQ instructor) Chief Instructor WTKO)
 Maeda Eiji, 6th dan (former JKA HQ instructor)
 Kawasaki Norio 6th dan (former JKA HQ instructor)
 Koike Yutaka 6th dan (former JKA HQ instructor)
 Fischer Malcolm 6th dan (former JKA HQ instructor)
 Montoya Leon 5th dan (former JKA HQ instructor) 

The list at the JKA's website, which includes most members who left or were expelled, may also be incomplete. The JKA has not included some former members who have completed the course and are not currently affiliated with JKA. In addition, during the troubled period between 1990 and 1999 each JKA faction held its own instructors' course. Currently, the JKA does not recognize graduates from the instructors' courses led by the JKS (Japan Karate Shoto Federation, which also held the name JKA between 1990 and 1999).

Karateka such as Dave Hazard (UK), Ennio Vezzuli (Brazil), Nigel Jackson (South Africa), Peté Pacheco (Portugal), Malcolm Fisher (Canada), Leon Montoya (Colombia), Richard Amos (UK, US), Pascal Lesage (France) and others, are mentioned in karate forums as having completed the JKA instructors' course (or having had substantial participation in it) but do not appear on the list of graduates as published in 2008 on the JKA's website.

In addition, the list does not include graduate instructors from the instructor programmes of splinter groups such as JKS and KWF, examples being  
Otsuka Masamichi (KWF - Japan),
Koike Yutaka (JKS - Japan), 
Inada Yasuhisa (JKS - Japan),  
Kyle Kamal Helou (JKS - Lebanon), 
Matsue Takeo (JKS- Japan),
Makita Takuya (JKS - Japan),
Nagaki Shinji (JKS - Japan).

Competition
Although Gichin Funakoshi wrote that there are no contests in Karate, Nakayama Masatoshi's teachings led to more scientific and competitive approach to the training and in 1957 the first All Japan Karate Championship was held, and has been held annually since.

World championships
In addition, the JKA has organised a number of international tournaments amongst which the following have been considered to be the JKA's World Championships:

Male Kumite

Male Kata

Female Kumite

Female Kata

References

External links
Official Site of JKA (In English)
Official Site of JKA (In Japanese)

Sports organizations established in 1949
1949 establishments in Japan
Karate
Karate organizations
Organizations based in Tokyo